Sri Lanka is an island country located southeast of the Republic of India and northeast of the Maldives. According to the International Monetary Fund, Sri Lanka's GDP in terms of purchasing power parity is second only to the Maldives in the South Asian region in terms of per capita income.

, the service sector makes up 60% of GDP, the industrial sector 28%, and the agriculture sector 12%. The private sector accounts for 85% of the economy. India is Sri Lanka's largest trading partner. Economic disparities exist between the provinces, with the Western province contributing 45.1% of the GDP and the Southern province and the Central province contributing 10.7% and 10%, respectively.

Largest firms
LMD 100, dubbed as "Sri Lanka's Fortune 500", annually lists the leading 100 quoted companies in Sri Lanka. Only the top 20 companies are listed below. All revenue figures reported before the financial year ending 2022.

Notable firms 
This list includes notable companies with primary headquarters located in the country. The industry and sector follow the Industry Classification Benchmark taxonomy. Organisations which have ceased operations are included and noted as defunct.

See also 
 Economy of Sri Lanka
 List of government owned companies in Sri Lanka
 List of statutory boards of Sri Lanka

References 

Sri Lanka